Justin Lewis (born 30 December 1982) is a Zimbabwean cricketer. He played twenty-five first-class matches between 1999 and 2011.

See also
 CFX Academy cricket team

References

External links
 

1982 births
Living people
Zimbabwean cricketers
CFX Academy cricketers
Manicaland cricketers
Midlands cricketers
Mid West Rhinos cricketers